In mathematics, Arakelov theory (or Arakelov geometry) is an approach to Diophantine geometry, named for Suren Arakelov. It is used to study Diophantine equations in higher dimensions.

Background
The main motivation behind Arakelov geometry is the fact there is a correspondence between prime ideals  and finite places , but there also exists a place at infinity , given by the Archimedean valuation, which doesn't have a corresponding prime ideal. Arakelov geometry gives a technique for compactifying  into a complete space  which has a prime lying at infinity. Arakelov's original construction studies one such theory, where a definition of divisors is constructor for a scheme  of relative dimension 1 over  such that it extends to a Riemann surface  for every valuation at infinity. This extra Hermitian structure is applied as a substitute for the failure of the scheme Spec(Z) to be a complete variety.

Note that other techniques exist for constructing a complete space extending , which is the basis of F1 geometry.

Original definition of divisors 
Also, we let  be an inclusion of fields (which is supposed to represent a place at infinity). The set of c-divisors forms a group .

Results

 defined an intersection theory on the arithmetic surfaces attached to smooth projective curves over number fields, with the aim of proving certain results, known in the case of function fields,
in the case of number fields.  extended Arakelov's work by establishing results such as a Riemann-Roch theorem, a Noether formula, a Hodge index theorem and the nonnegativity of the self-intersection of the dualizing sheaf in this context.

 developed a more general framework to define the intersection pairing defined on an arithmetic surface over the spectrum of a ring of integers  by Arakelov.

Arakelov's theory was generalized by Henri Gillet and Christophe Soulé to higher dimensions. That is, Gillet and Soulé defined an intersection pairing on an arithmetic variety.
For this one defines arithmetic Chow groups CHp(X) of an arithmetic variety X, and defines Chern classes for Hermitian vector bundles over X taking values in the arithmetic Chow groups. 
The arithmetic Riemann–Roch theorem then describes how the Chern class behaves under pushforward of vector bundles under a proper map of arithmetic varieties. A complete proof of this theorem was only published recently by Gillet, Rössler and Soulé.

The theory of Bost is based on the use of Green functions which, up to logarithmic singularities, belong to the Sobolev space . In this context, Bost obtains an arithmetic Hodge index theorem and uses this to obtain Lefschetz theorems for arithmetic surfaces.

Arithmetic Chow groups
An arithmetic cycle of codimension p is a pair (Z, g) where Z ∈ Zp(X) is a p-cycle on X and g is a Green current for Z, a higher-dimensional  generalization of a Green function. The arithmetic Chow group  of codimension p is the quotient of this group by the subgroup generated by certain "trivial" cycles.

The arithmetic Riemann–Roch theorem
The usual Grothendieck–Riemann–Roch theorem describes how the Chern character ch behaves under pushforward of sheaves, and states that ch(f*(E))= f*(ch(E)TdX/Y), where f is a proper morphism from X to Y and E is a vector bundle over f. The arithmetic Riemann–Roch theorem is similar, except that the Todd class gets multiplied by a certain power series. 
The arithmetic Riemann–Roch theorem states

where
X and Y are regular projective arithmetic schemes.
f is a smooth proper map from X to Y
E is an arithmetic vector bundle over X.
 is the arithmetic Chern character.
TX/Y is the relative tangent bundle
 is the arithmetic Todd class 
 is 
R(X) is the additive characteristic class associated to the formal power series

See also

Hodge–Arakelov theory
Hodge theory
P-adic Hodge theory
Adelic group

Notes

References

External links
Original paper
Arakelov geometry preprint archive

Algebraic geometry
Diophantine geometry